Krasnopolye is a rural locality (a village) in Brasovsky District, Bryansk Oblast, Russia. The population was 9 as of 2013. There is one street.

Geography 
Krasnopolye is located 22 km east of Lokot (the district's administrative centre) by road. Pozhar is the nearest rural locality.

References 

Rural localities in Brasovsky District